Friendship Christian School (FCS) is a private, Baptist, coeducational, primary and secondary day school located in Raleigh, North Carolina, United States. Also known as simply Friendship, the school seeks to educate students in a traditional Christian environment. The Administrator of the school is David McClain.

History
Friendship Christian School was founded in 1970 as a ministry of Friendship Baptist Church located in Raleigh, North Carolina. The first graduating class was in 1980, and since then FCS has graduated over 900 students.

Academics
FCS has been fully accredited by the Association of Christian Schools International (ACSI), Cognia, and the Middle States Association (MSA); their teachers are certified through ACSI.

Athletics
In 2018, Friendship Christian School switched from the NCCSA Athletic conference and joined the NCISAA. Friendship Athletics consists of Middle School/High School both men's and women's Cross-country, Soccer, Volleyball, Basketball, Baseball, and Golf. Friendship also has a women's cheerleading squad during basketball season.

External links
School website
Friendship Baptist Church website
Association of Christian Schools International Website

Baptist schools in the United States
Christian schools in North Carolina
Private elementary schools in North Carolina
Private high schools in North Carolina
Private middle schools in North Carolina
Private schools in Raleigh, North Carolina